Chemelil Sugar Football Club, or simply Chemelil Sugar FC, was a Kenyan football club based in Chemelil. They were playing in the top division in Kenyan football from 1997 to 2020 when the team got disbanded. Their home stadium was Chemelil Sports Complex. The club won Kenyan Cup in 2003, but most top clubs pulled out of the competition due to a feud between them and Kenya Football Federation. The club was owned by the Chemelil Sugar Company.

The club was founded in 1968 and joined the district league. It won the Provincial league in 1995 and was promoted to the Super League (the 2nd tier league in Kenya). The team needed only one season to be promoted to the Premier League.

Management
Team Manager: Hillary Ouma
Head Coach: Charles Odero
Media and Communications Officer: Alvin Wesonga

Achievements
Kenyan President's Cup: 1
2003

Performance in CAF competitions
CAF Confederation Cup: 2 appearances
2004 – Preliminary Round
2005 – withdrew in Preliminary Round

References

Kenyan Premier League clubs
Football clubs in Kenya
Sport in Nyanza Province
1968 establishments in Kenya
Association football clubs established in 1968
Works association football clubs in Kenya